Urkraft (English: Primordial Force) is the third album by Swedish viking metal band Thyrfing. It was released in 2000.

On some editions of the album, there is a bonus cover of "Over the Hills and Far Away" by rock musician Gary Moore.

Track listing
 "Mjölner" – 5:30
 "Dryckeskväde" (translation: "Drinking Poem") – 3:54
 "Sweoland Conqueror" – 6:30
 "Home Again" – 7:45
 "The Breaking of Serenity" – 4:28
 "Eldfärd" (translation: "Journey in Fire") – 1:39
 "Ways of a Parasite" – 4:39
 "Jord" (translation: "Earth") – 5:17
 "The Slumber of Yesteryears" – 3:48
 "Till Valfader Urgammal" (translation: "To Ancient Valfader") – 4:00
 "Urkraft" (translation: "Primordial Force") – 7:37
 "Over the Hills and Far Away" (Gary Moore cover) – 5:01

2000 albums
Thyrfing albums
Hammerheart Records albums